Moray was the name of a proposed new class of submarines developed by the Rotterdamsche Droogdok Maatschappij (RDM). While a Moray-class submarine was never actually build, the detailed design of the submarine class was fully completed.

Design 
A Moray-class submarine could be built in several sizes depending on the type of submarine that was needed. For smaller submarines that would patrol off the coast there was a design that ranged from 1100 ton to 1400 tons displacement, whereas oceangoing submarines ranged from 1800 to potentially 2000 tons displacement. Besides customization RDM also offered three standard types of Moray-class submarines which were called the 1100, 1400 and 1800. The number stood for roughly the amount of tonnage of the submarine. The three types had a length of 55.7 meters (1100), 64 meters (1400) and 75.9 meters (1800), while the beam was 6.4 meters and the draft 5.5 meters. The smallest submarine, the 1100, had space for a crew of 26.  The 1800 had space for a crew of 41.

While the Moray-class was derived from the Walrus-class submarine, it had several differences with that class. The main difference was that the size of a Moray-class submarine was significantly smaller than a submarine of the Walrus-class, which weighed around 2800 tons. Another difference was that the hull of the Moray-class was, unlike both the Zwaardvis and Walrus-class submarines, not in the shape of a tear drop. The more straight lined hull of the Moray-class made it possible to extend or shorten the submarine. It also allowed the insertion of a hull section that included a air-independent propulsion (AIP) system. A submarine of the Moray-class could also dive less deep than a Walrus-class submarine. The Moray-class submarines had a estimated diving depth of more than 300 meters.

The price of a Moray-class submarine was estimated to cost around 220 million Dutch guilders in 1989.

Notes

Citations

References

External links 
Scale model of a Moray-class submarine at the Rotterdam City Archive (Dutch: Stadsarchief Rotterdam).
Submarine classes
Submarines of the Netherlands
Proposed ships